Lars Eriksson may refer to:

Lars Eriksson (footballer, born 1926), Swedish football midfielder
Lars Eriksson (footballer, born 1965), Swedish football goalkeeper
Lars Eriksson (ice hockey) (born 1961), Swedish ice hockey goaltender
Lars Eriksson (musician) (born 1980), Swedish singer and songwriter
Lars Eriksson (politician) (born 1970), Swedish politician
Lasse Eriksson (1949–2011), Swedish comedian, actor and writer

See also
Lars Eriksen (born 1954), Norwegian cross country skier
Lars Erickssong, fictional character in Eurovision